Xinyi, alternately romanized as Sunyi, is a county-level city in Guangdong Province, China. It is administered as part of the prefecture-level city of Maoming in the southwestern corner of the province, bordering Guangxi to the west. As of the 2020 census, it had a population of 1,014,577 people. Though its metro area is much smaller with 418,731 inhabitants considered urban.

History
Under the Qing, Xinyi County formed part of the prefecture of Gaozhou. After the Chinese Civil War, it was reorganized under Maoming.

Transportation 
China National Highway 207

Schools 
Xinyi Middle School, the first county school in Xinyi District, was set up in 1916. It is now a national-level model high school.

Districts 
 Zhusha

Climate

Notes

References

External links
 
  

 
County-level cities in Guangdong
Maoming